Julie Stahmer Linsey (born 1979) is an American mechanical engineer whose research concerns creativity in the early phases of engineering design. She is a professor in the George W. Woodruff School of Mechanical Engineering at Georgia Tech.

Education and career
Linsey majored in mechanical engineering at the University of Michigan, graduating in 2001. After working for a year at Agilent Technologies, she went to the University of Texas at Austin for graduate study in mechanical engineering, earning a master's degree in 2005 and completing her Ph.D. in 2007.

She became an assistant professor at Texas A&M University in 2008, and moved to Georgia Tech in 2013. She was promoted to associate professor in 2015, and to full professor in 2021.

Recognition
Linsey was the 2012 winner of the Ferdinand P. Beer and E. Russell Johnston, Jr. Outstanding New Mechanics Educator Award of the American Society for Engineering Education.

References

External links
Home page

1979 births
Living people
American mechanical engineers
American women engineers
University of Michigan alumni
University of Texas at Austin alumni
Texas A&M University faculty
Georgia Tech faculty
21st-century American engineers
21st-century women engineers